Jeopardy! National College Championship is a special tournament series of the game show Jeopardy! that aired on ABC from February 8 to 22, 2022.

Format
Participants enter 12 quarterfinal games, with 2 games broadcast per episode. Winners of every game advance to the semifinals and eliminated players receive a $10,000 consolation prize. The 12 semifinalists are then split into 4 matches, with the top 3 scorers entering the finals. The bottom 7 semifinalists receive a prize of $20,000, whilst the 4th place receives a $35,000 prize and entry into the daily show's upcoming Second Chance Tournament later in 2022. The highest scorer of the 2-game final receives the 1st place prize of $250,000, 2nd place receives $100,000 and 3rd place receives $50,000. Unlike the regular College Championship, there are no wild card spots for high-scorers among non-winners; it was "win or go home".

Contestants
The 36 contestants were announced on February 2, 2022.

Production
On August 11, 2021, it was announced that ABC had ordered the series with Mayim Bialik as the host and Mike Richards as the executive producer. Richards was dismissed and replaced by Michael Davies on August 31 of the same year.  On December 2, 2021, it was announced that the series would premiere on February 8, 2022.

Episodes

Match summaries

See also 
 Strategies and skills of Jeopardy! champions

References

External links
 
 

2020s American television specials
2022 in American television
American Broadcasting Company television specials
English-language television shows
Jeopardy!
Culver City, California
Television series by Sony Pictures Television
Television shows filmed in California